Takhir Sabirov (December 21, 1929 – May 30, 2002) is a Tajik film director, actor, screenwriter, art director, and one of the most notable figures of the Tajik cinema. He is known as the "founding father" of the One Thousand and One Nights dynasty of the film industry due to his creation of the Scheherazade trilogy.

He is also known by his formal name Takhir Mukhtorovich Sabirov. His mother Mastona Sobir Zoda was the daughter of Duke Sobir-kaloni Tura-zoda of Samarkand (now part of the Samarqand Province, Uzbekistan), from the Duchy of Greater Khorasan, known as Tura-zoda, who were eminent members of  Central Asia's Aristocracy. Takhir was the youngest of five children.  He was married twice and has two sons and three daughters.

He completed the Performing Arts discipline at the Tashkent State Art Institute of Theatrical Arts in Tashkent, Uzbekistan. In 1951, he then continued further by obtaining his Directorial discipline under faculty of Yuri Zavadsky at The Russian Academy of Theatre Arts (GITIS) in Moscow, Russia.

His first film,  "Roh" (1955) (Russian title: Дорога)  produced by Mosfilm initiated him into the film industry, but the role of Yodgor in "Dokhunda" (1956) sparked his career and was followed by several successful roles. His directorial debut was in "Vaqti zangirii pisar rasid" (Russian title: "Sinu para jinitsa", 1959), which was the first comedy musical motion picture in the Cinema of Tajikistan. With his films he introduced the Tajik film industry onto international scenebasis with his nomination in International film festivals. His film "Margi Sudkhur" (Russian title: "Smert' Rostovshika", 1966) was nominated at the International Film Festival of Asia and Africa in 1968.

His trilogy of "New Tales of  Scheherazade", "Another Night of  Scheherazade" and The Last Night of Scheherazade that were based on the Arabic folktale One Thousand and One Nights had made a great impact in the Cinema of Tajikistan by opening it to European audiences and borders. The Scheherazade  trilogies were among the first Tajik film productions that achieved distribution beyond Russian (former USSR) borders, placing Tajik film on the map of International Film Festivals. Not only has he directed and co-written the Scheherazade trilogies, but also starred as King Shahryar (Sultan); which coincidentally is more true to his own lineage of royalty. He became a cultural icon gaining more acknowledgement and respect.

Regardless of the obstacles he had faced in his lifetime, he never stopped filming. He is known in the Tajik film industry as one of the major film directors of his time. He broadened his entertainment field as he established entrepreneurial joint venture "Movarounnahr Joint Venture" as an Art Director. Although he was involved in many fields of the film industry, he always had time to instruct and inspire students and apprentices.

In 1999, he was part of the judging committee in the 21st (XXI) Moscow International Film Festival. He became the first Tajik film director to be honored with the position of a film judge. In 2002, he was an honorary guest at the 55th (LV) Cannes Film Festival. Even in his seventy years of age he was involved in film production. However, on May 30, 2002 he died with his film "Khoja Kamoli Khujandi" still in production. In 2003, a street, "Takhir Sabirov Street" was named after his death for his contributions in the Cinema of Tajikistan (Tajikfilm, Tajik Film Studio).

Awards and honors 
 Laurette of (winner) of the ("Gospremii") State Award of Tajikistan
 Accredited National Actor of Tajikistan
 People's Artist of Tajikistan (USSR)
 Postmortem honor street named Takhir Sabirov Street in Dushanbe, Tajikistan

Membership 
 USSR Cinematographic Union
 Central Committee of Tajikistan Komsomol Tajikfilm Studio

Filmography
Year     Title: Tajik/Russian/English (role)
1955    Roh/Doroga/The Road (actor)
1956    Dokhunda (actor)
1957    Man bo dukhtare vokhurdam/Ya vstretil devushku/I Met a Girl (actor)
1957    Bahori notakror/Nepovtorimaya vesna/A Unique Spring (actor)
1958    Nasriddin dar Khujand/Nasriddin v Khujande/Nasriddin in Khujand (actor)
1959    Vaqti zangirii picar rasid/Sinu para jinitsa/Time for the Son to Marry (director)
1960    Fidoiyon (director)
1963    Shohsanam va Gharib/ Shakhsenem i garib/Shakhsenem and Garib/Legend of Love/La Legende De L'amour (director)
1966    Margi sudkhur/Smert' Rostovshika (director)
1967    Khiyonat/Izmena/Betrayal (writer) (director)
1968    Kashfi asror (director)
1970    Maidoni parvoz (director)
1971    Tyfon dar void/Uragan v daline/Hurricane in the Valley (director)
1973    Hejbudagon/Kto byl nichem (director) (series)
1975    Hejbudagon har chiz meshavand (director) (series)
1978    Zane az diyori dur/Zhenshina iz daleka/Woman from far away (director)
1979    Aspho dar zeri moh (actor)
1980    Vokhuri dar darai marg/Vstrecha v uzchelye smerty /Meetin in the Canyon of Death (actor) (director)
1980    Khobhoi bahori (actor)
1980    Nassymbek/Nassymbek/Nassymbek (actor)
1981    Khonaat obod boshad (actor) (director) (series)
1983    Priklyucheniya malenkogo Muka (actor) (TV)
1984    Boz yak shabi Shahrzod/I eshchyo odna noch Shekherazady /And Another Sheherezade Night (actor) (director) (writer)
1985    Qismati Malika/Sudba printsessy/Fate of the Princess (actor) (director)
1986    Afsonahoi navi Shahrzod/Novye skazki Shakherezady/New Tales of Sheherezade (actor) (director) (writer)
1987    Shabi okhironi Shahrzod/Poslednyaya noch Shakherezady/The Last Night of Scheherazade (actor) (director) (writer)
1991    Ashq va shamsher/Slyezi I mech/Tears and sword (director) (series)
1996    Pairohai qismat (director) (cofilm with Iran (series))
1999    Khoja Kamoli Khujandi/Khodja Kamoli iz Khujanda/Khoja Kamoli from Khujand (director) (series)(unfinished)

See also 
 Russian cinema
Iranian cinema
Tajikistan

References

 Cowie, Peter and  Elley, Derek  (ed.) World Filmography:1967 London: A.S.Barnes & Co., Inc. 1977. 
Tashkent State Art Institute of Theatrical Arts

"Сабиров Тахир Мухтарович"(in Russian)

Ethnic Tajik people
Tajikistani film directors
Persian-language film directors
1929 births
2002 deaths